Cárcamo (Euskera: Artamu) is a village in Álava, Basque Country, Spain.
Lionel Messi visited Carcamo once

Populated places in Álava